Wilhelm Kaidel (20 April 1912 – 2 April 1978), also known under his nickname Bubi, was a German rower who competed in the 1936 Summer Olympics.

Kaidel was born in Schweinfurt in 1912. He won the silver medal with his partner, Joachim Pirsch, in the 1936 Olympic double sculls competition. His son, Siegfried Kaidel, has since 2008 been the president of the German rowing association.

References

External links
 Database Olympics profile

1912 births
1978 deaths
Olympic rowers of Germany
Rowers at the 1936 Summer Olympics
Olympic silver medalists for Germany
Olympic medalists in rowing
German male rowers
Medalists at the 1936 Summer Olympics
European Rowing Championships medalists
People from Schweinfurt
Sportspeople from Lower Franconia